The Škoda Superb is a mid-size/large family car (D-segment) that has been produced by the Czech car manufacturer Škoda Auto since 2001.

The first generation of the modern Superb, produced from 2001 to 2008, was based on the VW B5 PL45+ platform. The second generation Superb used the B6 A6/PQ46 and was introduced in 2008. The third, and current, generation using the MQB platform, entered production in 2015.



First generation (B5, Typ 3U; 2001–2008)

The first generation of the modern Škoda Superb used the Volkswagen Group B5 PL45+ platform, which was later also used on 1999 Shanghai–Volkswagen Passat B5 LWB, whose wheelbase is however  longer than the standard Passat B5. In 2005, Shanghai-Volkswagen imported the Superb, rebadging it as the Volkswagen Passat Lingyu.

In 2009, one year after the B5 generation had been discontinued in Europe, the facelifted Volkswagen Passat Lingyu was unveiled in China. In 2011, the Volkswagen Passat Lingyu was discontinued, succeeded by the Passat NMS.

Several petrol and diesel internal combustion engines are shared with the rest of the Volkswagen Group range; and like the B5 Passat and B6/B7 Audi A4 which use the same automobile platform, they are mounted at the front, and orientated longitudinally.

Transmissions included a five speed or a six speed manual gearbox, or a ZF sourced five speed tiptronic automatic. In addition to the 1.9 litre "Pumpe Düse" (PD) Unit Injector engine, the Superb eventually gained the  2.0 litre TDI PD (BSS). This was an 8V single camshaft engine based on the 1.9 litre TDI that was unique to the Superb with two main differences over the 1.9 litre TDI. The BSS engine shared the same twin balance shaft oil pump used in the 16V twin camshaft 2.0 litre TDI PD engine that can be found in various Audi models. It also featured a wet DPF that used fluid contained in a tank under the spare wheel to generate heat for regeneration. This was used over a standard dry DPF due to space limitations in the engine bay.

The Superb received a minor facelift in August 2006 incorporating Škoda's new radiator grille, headlights, side repeater indicators integrated into the door mirrors, and C-shaped tail lights in the style of Škoda Roomster and second-gen Škoda Octavia.

An interior redesign completed the upgrades. A 'Laurin and Klement' model became the top of the range, replacing the 'Elegance' model. A range of new engines was introduced and the interior featured real wood as part of some trim levels. The 'Comfort', 'Elegance' and 'Laurin & Klement' models feature an umbrella stowed in the rear door panel.

Škoda considered an station wagon version of the Superb, but it never proceeded to production. The reason it was not put in production was that Volkswagen feared that an station wagon version would take too much market share from its own Passat Variant and Audi's A4 Avant. When the Superb was released in the United Kingdom in May 2002, the most expensive variant was priced at only £1,000 more than the cheapest Jaguar X-Type.

Engines

Second generation (B6, Typ 3T; 2008–2015)

An all new Škoda Superb (B6, Typ 3T) was unveiled at the Geneva Motor Show in early March 2008.

Based on a stretched version of the latest A5 Octavia platform, the Volkswagen Group A6 PQ46, this Superb is a four door five seat sedan, with an innovative "TwinDoor" trunk lid that can operate as a conventional trunk or as a hatchback that includes opening with the rear glass.

Being based on the Octavia A5 platform, this Superb now uses a transverse engine layout. A Superb Combi – five door estate with 633 litres in the boot – was presented to the press in June 2009, and debuted at the Frankfurt Motor Show in September 2009.

When launched, petrol engine options included four Volkswagen Group sourced units; consisting of an entry-level 92 kilowatts (125 PS; 123 hp) 1.4 litre inline four cylinder (I4) TFSI (with a turbocharger and Fuel Stratified Injection), and a 118 kW (160 PS; 158 hp) 1.8 litre I4 TFSI. The flagship 3.6 litre 191 kW (260 PS; 256 hp) FSI VR6 engine (a detuned version of that fitted in the Passat R36) comes with four-wheel drive and six speed Direct-Shift Gearbox (DSG). The Škoda Superb 3.6 FSI 4x4 has a top speed 250 km/h and acceleration of 0–100 km/h in 6.5 seconds.

Diesel engine options included 2.0 litre I4 Turbocharged Direct Injection (TDI) with Pumpe-Düse injection which was rated at 103 kW (140 PS; 138 hp), 2.0 litre I4 TDI 125 kW (170 PS; 168 hp) with common rail, and a 77 kW (105 PS; 103 hp) 1.9 litre I4 TDI available also for the Greenline version with reduced fuel consumption.

In 2010, the engine range was updated. The car was now available with a 147 kW (200 PS; 197 hp) 2.0 litre TFSI petrol four cylinder. Changes in diesel offer included two switches: 103 kW two litre with Pumpe-Düse injection was replaced with common rail engine; the 77 kW 1.9 litre PD unit was replaced with 1.6 litre common rail engine of the same power.

Transmissions include five and six speed manual gearboxes, and the popular automatic Direct-Shift Gearbox (DSG) with either six or seven speeds, as an option on almost all engine/trim combinations. In addition to the standard front-wheel-drive, the Superb and Superb Combi were both available with all-wheel-drive with a fourth generation Haldex clutch. The wheels were choice of 16", 17" and 18".

Trim levels available in the majority of Europe were named the 'Comfort', 'Ambition', 'Elegance', 'Greenline', 'Exclusive' and 'Laurin & Klement' (May 2012) – with Laurin & Klement being top of the range. In the United Kingdom, the levels available were 'S', 'SE', 'Elegance', 'Laurin & Klement' and 'Greenline'. In Sweden, an important market for Škoda, a version of the four-wheel-drive Superb Combi with off-road pretensions went on sale in June 2012. Analogous to the Subaru Outback and Volvo XC70 it was called the "AllDrive." Based on the Elegance equipment level it features black plastic cladding around the lower parts of the car and around the wheelwells. In Sweden it was only available with the three different engines (one petrol, two diesels) and four-wheel-drive, but when the model was made available across Europe as the "Škoda Superb Outdoor" one month later (reaching the United Kingdom in October 2012) it was also available with front-wheel-drive, and most of the engine range.

For the Superb there is an extensive list of standard and extra equipment, including bi-xenon headlamps with AFS, front/rear proximity sensors, automatic park assist system, tyre pressure monitoring system, navigation system with large 6.5" colour touch screen display and 30 GB hard drive, television broadcast receiver, electrically adjustable seats and mirrors, rain sensor, sunroof with solar panels that allow circulation of air in parked car, front/rear heated seats, ventilated front seats upholstered in leather. For the Superb Combi a large tilt/slide two piece panoramic sunroof was an option.

Selected acknowledgements 
 2009: Luxury Car of the Year in 2009 by Top Gear Magazine
 2009: Towcar of the Year 2009, and Class Winner 2010 (over 1800 kg AWD Category) by UK Caravan Club
 2012: Best imported car survey in the German magazine Auto, Motor und Sport
 2012: Highest score in the JD Power customer satisfaction study (UK) in the mid-size segment
 2011-13: Best-Value Family Car in Australian Money magazine

Facelift 

In April 2013, Škoda unveiled a facelifted Superb in Shanghai. It was released for sale in the European market in June 2013. Updated exterior design features Škoda new design language elements. Headlights are fitted with integrated LED daylight running lights; diodes are standard for tail lights, too. The Twindoor opening mechanism was changed in order to provide easier operation: one button opens just the lid, while the other opens whole tailgate.

Up to now, one button was dedicated just for opening, while the other had shifting function. With the facelift, a combination of all wheel drive and DSG automatic transmission appeared on offer for the 125 kW two litre diesel engine. Starting from January 2014, design Outdoor package is available for the Superb Combi.

The list of features was slightly expanded too. The facelifted Superb received the latest generation of Automatic Parking Assistant. In addition to parallel parking (entering/exiting the parking space), the system is also capable of perpendicular parking (entering the parking space only).

From now on, the passengers in the rear seats can adjust the passenger seat from the back. The electrical control is located on the side of the passenger seat near the centre console and is thus easy to operate from the back. Passengers in the rear can move the front seat forward and back and adjust the seat height and angle.

Engines 
Overview of engines available for the second generation Superb (B6, Typ 3T), incl. facelifted model.

Third generation (B8, Typ 3V; 2015–present)

The third generation Superb, based on the Volkswagen Group MQB platform also used by other Volkswagen Group cars, including the Volkswagen Passat (B8), Volkswagen Arteon, Volkswagen Tiguan Mk2, Volkswagen Tayron, Škoda Kodiaq, SEAT Tarraco and Audi Q3 Mk2, was unveiled in February 2015 at the 2015 Geneva Motor Show, with volume production intended to start in the middle of the year. The car was first previewed by concept car called Škoda Vision C that was debuted in 2014 Geneva Motor Show.

The new model is larger than the second generation. The Škoda Superb appeared in the Tour de France as a Referee car.

The new generation of direct injection turbocharged engines consisting of four cylinder units, was to include five petrol engines ranging in size from 1.4 to 2.0 litres, and three diesels of 1.6 or 2.0 litres. The Superb 2.0 TSI 4x4  is currently Škoda's fastest production car, with a top speed drive by 

Dealer deliveries of the sedan began in June 2015, with the station wagon followed in September.

In the United Kingdom, the trim levels available were named the 'S', 'SE', 'SE Technology', 'SE L Executive', 'SportLine' and 'Laurin & Klement', with Laurin & Klement being top of the range. As of 2016, price ranges from £19,060, to the most luxurious L&K trim with all equipment for £42,385.

Selected acknowledgements 
The Superb received very positive reviews in all foreign tests. British newspaper The Telegraph rated the new Superb with an overall rating of 9/10, Autocar 4/5, Top Gear 8/10, Auto Express 5/5, and in the German magazine Auto Bild, the Superb received 588 points. The Superb has also scored highly in Australia, where Car Advice awarded an overall rating of 9/10 highlighting key areas of value for money, features, performance and cabin space where the car has excelled. The Superb also defeated its rivals, in AutoBild test the Mercedes-Benz E-Class (E220 CDI) and in Auto Express the Volkswagen Passat 2.0 TDI.

The Škoda Superb was also awarded the title of Car of the Year in the Czech Republic and in Macedonia.

It also became the 2016 World Car of the Year finalist, the best compact executive car and estate car in 2016 on What Car? (the United Kingdom's leading car buying website) and the Auto Express Family Car of the Year 2016.

In January 2021, the Skoda Superb Estate 2.0 TDI 150 SE L was named Estate Car of the Year by What Car? magazine. What Car? awarded the Superb Estate five stars out of five in its review of the car.

Facelift 

In May 2019, the facelifted Škoda Superb was unveiled in Bratislava. Škoda has added matrix full-LED headlights, Predictive Cruise Control and Emergency Assist.

The new Škoda Superb Scout brings with its taller suspension and underbody protection a little bit of off-road ability. The facelifted car gone on sale in early 2020.

Engines
Engine specifications:

* Since September 2016, the 1.4 TSI (92 kW) and 1.6 TDI (88 kW) engines were no longer available, leaving 110 kW as the weakest engines.

* Since Model Year 2017, Škoda began equipping the 2.0 Litre 150hp Diesel and Petrol Superb with DQ381 DSG Gearboxes. Since Model Year 2018, the gearboxes were featured on the 2.0 Litre Diesel and Petrol Superb with 190hp. These gearboxes replaced the previously used DQ250 6-Speed "wet" dual-clutch gearbox. The newer DQ381 is a "wet" dual-clutch 7-Speed Gearbox.

As emergency vehicles 
In April 2021, the New Zealand Police began replacing their current fleet of 2,000 Holden police cars with two and four wheel drive Škoda Superbs, joining 30 European countries such as France, the Netherlands and the United Kingdom.

The first 100 are expected to be in service by the end of June, with nearly 400 more to follow by the end of the year. Delivery of all 2,000 Superbs is scheduled within a maximum of four years.

In 2018, the Norwegian military police starting utilising Superbs as one of their new vehicles, notably also sporting a new livery.

In 2022 Western Australia Police have started using the Škoda Superb Sportline 206 Wagons.

References

External links

Superb
Mid-size cars
Flagship vehicles
Euro NCAP large family cars
Sedans
Hatchbacks
Station wagons
Front-wheel-drive vehicles
2010s cars
Cars introduced in 2001
Cars powered by VR engines
Cars of the Czech Republic
All-wheel-drive vehicles
Cars powered by longitudinal 4-cylinder engines
Plug-in hybrid vehicles